Baguley railway station was a station in the south of Manchester, England, at the extreme western edge of Baguley near the southern end of Brooklands Road where Shady Lane crossed the railway line.

History

Served by the Stockport, Timperley and Altrincham Junction Railway (ST&AJ), Baguley station was opened on 1 December 1865. From 15 August 1867 the ST&AJ became part of the Cheshire Lines Committee (CLC) and from the Grouping of 1923, the CLC was jointly owned by the London and North Eastern Railway and London, Midland and Scottish Railway companies. The station then passed under the control of the London Midland Region of British Railways on nationalisation in 1948.

Baguley station was served by local passenger trains from Stockport Tiviot Dale to Warrington Central and continuing on to Liverpool Central station. A separate service operated from Stockport via Baguley to Altrincham.

For most of the station's existence, the passenger trains were hauled by steam locomotives, but for a period up to the beginning of the Second World War, the services from Stockport and Baguley to Altrincham were performed by the CLC's Sentinel steam railcars. The station closed on 30 November 1964  when passenger trains were withdrawn by British Railways.

Potential reopening

Chester and Northwich-bound passenger trains from Manchester Piccadilly via Stockport and Altrincham continue to pass through the site. Freight trains also use the line Baguley, including heavy block trains carrying limestone from quarries at Tunstead (near Buxton) to alkali works at Northwich.

Proposals were made in the early 2000s to reopen a station in the Baguley area when the extension of the Metrolink out to Wythenshawe and Manchester Airport is actioned. In May 2011 re-opening of the station on the Stockport-Altrincham line was included in Transport for Greater Manchester's Passenger Plan. The station would be on Southmoor Road and would be a tram/train interchange with the Baguley tram stop, which opened in 2014.

Services

References 
Notes

Bibliography

External links 
Station on navigable O. S. map
Baguley Station at Sub Brit

Disused railway stations in Manchester
Railway stations in Great Britain opened in 1866
Railway stations in Great Britain closed in 1964
Former Cheshire Lines Committee stations
Beeching closures in England
Wythenshawe
1866 establishments in England